The 2011 W-League season was the 17th season of the league's existence, and 8th season of second division women's soccer in the United States. The regular season began on May 14 and ended on July 17.

Changes from 2010 season

Name changes 
One team changed their name in the off-season:

Expansion teams 
Five teams were added for the season:

Teams leaving 
Six teams either folded or left following the 2010 season:

 Chicago Red Eleven
 Hudson Valley Quickstrike Lady Blues
 Kalamazoo Outrage
 Tampa Bay Hellenic (joined WPSL)
 Washington Freedom Futures (disbanded when Washington Freedom franchise relocated to South Florida)
 Western New York Flash (joined WPS)

Standings 
As of 7/17/2011 
Orange indicates Host Team for W-League Championship
Purple indicates division title clinched
Green indicates playoff berth clinched

Central Conference

Central Division

Eastern Conference

Atlantic Division

Northeast Division

Western Conference

Western Division

Playoffs

 Note: Seattle Sounders Women hosts the W-League Championship and gains an automatic berth in the National Semi-Finals.

Eastern Conference Playoffs

Central Conference Playoffs

Western Conference Playoff

W-League Championship

Semi-finals

Third Place Playoff

Championship

References 

2011
2
W